John Anthony Fingleton  (born 21 September 1965) is an Irish-British economist and former CEO of the Office of Fair Trading. He is Senior Independent Member of the Innovate UK Board.

Early life and career 
Fingleton was born in September 1965, he studied economics at Trinity College Dublin and Nuffield College Oxford, writing his PhD under supervision from James Mirrlees and graduating with a DPhil in 1991.

After graduating from Oxford, Fingleton taught economics at the London School of Economics and Trinity College Dublin. While an academic at TCD, he advocated deregulation of the Irish taxi market and a relaxation of restrictive licensing laws in alcohol retail. In 2000, Fingleton was appointed chairman of the Competition Authority of Ireland - where he made a number of prominent hires including former FTC Commissioner Terry Calvani. Fingleton was also responsible for managing the introduction of the Irish Competition Act 2002 into law.

Office of Fair Trading 
In 2005, Fingleton was appointed Chief Executive of the Office of Fair Trading. While at the OfT, he led investigations into bank overdraft fees, competition between supermarkets, credit cards, and the PPI market, as well as an investigation into UK airports that led to the breakup of BAA.  Fingleton was criticised during his tenure for his high salary, which at £275,000 made him the second-highest paid civil servant in the UK, after the Governor of the Bank of England.

Fingleton left the OfT in 2012, just before it and the Competition Commission were merged to form the new Competition and Markets Authority. He was succeeded by Clive Maxwell.

Later career 
Fingleton now runs a company advising businesses with competition and regulation problems. In 2015, he called for BT and Openreach to be split up to increase competition in the broadband market. In 2018, he wrote a report attacking the government's plans to expand the national security test in mergers, which he warned would be damaging to the UK economy.

Public office
Fingleton is a board member of UKRI and 
Fingleton was appointed Commander of the Order of the British Empire (CBE) in the 2022 New Year Honours for services to the economy and innovation.

References

20th-century Irish economists
1965 births
Living people
Irish chief executives
Alumni of Trinity College Dublin
Alumni of Nuffield College, Oxford
Commanders of the Order of the British Empire
21st-century Irish economists